Yehor Luhachov (born 24 December 1988 in Sumy in the Ukrainian SSR) is a retired Ukrainian footballer.

Career
He played for FC Hirnyk-Sport Komsomolsk. He also played for the Ukraine national under-21 football team.

He made his debut for Spartak on 27 July 2008 when he came on as a last minute substitute in a game against FC Luch-Energiya Vladivostok.

External links
  Player page on the official FC Spartak Moscow website
 
  Player page on Official FFU Site

1988 births
Living people
Sportspeople from Sumy
Ukrainian footballers
FC Spartak Moscow players
FC Arsenal Kyiv players
FC Poltava players
FC Hirnyk-Sport Horishni Plavni players
Ukrainian Premier League players
Russian Premier League players
Ukrainian expatriate footballers
Expatriate footballers in Russia
Ukrainian expatriate sportspeople in Russia
FC Kolos Kovalivka players
Association football midfielders